Terrateig is a municipality in the comarca of Vall d'Albaida in the Valencian Community, Spain.

Monuments 
 Hermitage of San Vicente Ferrer: One of the Terrateig barons decided to perpetuate the memory of San Vicente Ferrer by building this hermitage in 1410. No remains of what was the primitive hermitage have been preserved, the current one was inaugurated in 1883.

Cuisine 
In Terrateig, as in the rest of the Central Counties, the cuisine is as varied as the landscape. For centuries, the slopes of the mountains have been terraced and almond, olive, cherry, and fig trees have been planted. On the riverbank and the foothills of the mountains with a lot of work, dams and ditches were built. Aubergines, broad beans, Swiss chard, turnips, artichokes, pumpkins, year-round melons, Alger melons were grown in family gardens... And later, in the 15th century, tomatoes, corn and potatoes arrived from overseas. Cereals, vines and fruit trees were cultivated in the rainfed plains. The meat would be provided by the corrals and the sierra. The fish would come in the form of salt from the coast. Sugar was sold by the residents of La Safor, who also sweetened half of Europe.

The origin of the traditional cuisine of Terrateig would have a Mediterranean base influenced by Arab (and Moorish) cuisine and with the potential that the arrival of the Crown of Aragon meant.

The pastry has a strong Arab influence. Very sweet cakes such as “arrop i talladetes” or “les anous i rovells al fondant”. Almond cakes, sweet potato cakes, almoixàvenes, celestial cokes, gypsy arms, carquinyols (rosegosns), llanda cokes, fogasses or the poorest pasta: els negocis.

References

Municipalities in the Province of Valencia
Vall d'Albaida